was a Japanese daimyō of the Sengoku period. He was born in Bizen Province, to Ukita Okiie, a local samurai leader and head of the Ukita clan.

Biography
Naoie's grandfather Yoshiie was killed by Shimamura clan in 1534, Naoie narrowly escaped from Toishi castle along with his father Ukita Okiie. Two years later after his father died, he become head of Ukita clan in the age of seven years old.

In 1543, he became a vassal of Uragami Munekage and made remarkable progress in his war service. 

In 1544, Naoie was appointed as the lord of small castle called Otogo Castle. A year later, he was given command of 30 ashigaru to defend the fort and was rewarded for fighting treacherous Munekage's enemies.

In 1559, he killed his father-in-law Nakayama Nobumasa by order of Uragami Munekage and restored their old territory. 

In 1567, at the Battle of Myōzenji, Naoie succeeded in expelling almost all forces from Bitchū who had entered the western portion of Bizen.

In 1569, Naoie joined with Oda Nobunaga and Akamatsu Masahide of western Harima Province to rebel against his lord, Uragami Munekage. However, Munekage attacking Masahide at Tatsuno Castle and force Masahide to surrender. Munekage, whereupon give Naoie a special exception to return to serve him.

In 1570, Naoie killed Okayama castle lord Kanemitsu Munetaka and started remodeling the castle 
and moved Ukita clan's main bastion from Numa castle in 1573. 

In 1574, since the influence of Naoie was increasing, Uragami Munekage attempted to oust Naoie. Naoie was dissatisfied with the Munekage decision, he allied with Mōri clan and launched a rebellion against Munekage. 
Naoie attacked Tenjinyama castle successfully, effectively ending Uragami Munekage's rule. 

In 1579, the Ukita clan resisted an advance by Hashiba Hideyoshi, who led a westward march upon orders of Oda Nobunaga. Sensing Oda Nobunaga's victory over the Mori clan, Naoie sent a force to help the Mori, but not present citing personal illness as an excuse. 

Later in 1581, Naoie cut ties with the Mōri clan and submitted to Nobunaga. Thereafter, he engaged in battles across Mimasaka and Bizen against the Mōri.

In February 1582, He died in Okayama Castle. But strategic maneuver proved effective. Nobunaga confirmed his heir, Ukita Hideie, to inherit his domain. later, Toyotomi Hideyoshi adopted Hideie.

References

1529 births
1582 deaths
Daimyo
People from Okayama Prefecture
Ukita clan